Roland Puhr (January 21, 1914 – April 15, 1964) was an SS-Unterscharführer who committed numerous atrocities at Sachsenhausen concentration camp during World War II. After the war, he settled down in East Germany using forged papers. Puhr was exposed as a war criminal in 1963, and executed the following year.

Early life 
Puhr was born in Staré Křečany in Bohemia in 1914. He joined the Sudeten German Party in 1936.

Wartime activities 
In the 1930s, Puhr joined the Czechoslovakian military. In 1938, he deserted to join the Wehrmacht. In 1939, Puhr joined the Nazi Party. He was then assigned to the SS-Totenkopfverbände and sent to work as a guard at Sachsenhausen concentration camp. During his time, Puhr participated in the shootings of multiple Soviet POWs at the camp's execution site. He personally murdered approximately 30 to 40 prisoners. One of them was Austrian prosecutor Karl Tuppy, who initiated the prosecution of Otto Planetta for the murder of Austrian Chancellor Engelbert Dollfuss in 1934. Puhr was suspected of additional targeted killings at an SS construction brigade near Düsseldorf. Puhr was also the first commandant of the Lager Sylt camp in the Channel Islands.

Exposure, trial, and execution 
After war ended, Puhr went into hiding using forged papers. He started a new life in Schönhausen. However, in June 1963, Puhr was exposed and arrested by East German authorities. He was charged with war crimes and crimes against humanity. On December 16, 1963, Puhr was found guilty by a court in Neubrandenburg and sentenced to death. His appeal was rejected, and Chairman of the State Council Walter Ulbricht rejected his petition for clemency. Puhr was guillotined at Leipzig Prison on April 15, 1964. His remains were then cremated, and he was buried in an unmarked grave in an undisclosed location.

References 

1914 births
1964 deaths
Austrian people convicted of crimes against humanity
Holocaust perpetrators in Germany
Sudeten German people
Sachsenhausen concentration camp personnel
Nazis executed by East Germany by guillotine
SS non-commissioned officers
People executed for crimes against humanity
Executed Nazi concentration camp commandants
Executed Austrian Nazis
Executed mass murderers